Mario Domingo Barletta (born 30 December 1953) is an Argentine hydraulic engineer and politician. He served as mayor of Santa Fe, Argentina from 2007 to 2011, and was elected President of the Radical Civic Union (UCR) in 2011. Since 2021, he has been a National Deputy.

Biography

Academic career
Barletta was born in Santa Fe. He enrolled at the National University of the Littoral (UNL) and graduated with a degree in Hydraulic Engineering in 1978. He later took postgraduate courses in the United States (at the universities of Illinois  and Columbia). He has a Master of Social Sciences from FLACSO (the Latin American Social Sciences Institute).

Barletta was a professor at the Faculty of Engineering and Hydrical Sciences, and guest professor in other universities. He worked in his field at the Centro Regional Litoral and in the water departments of the provincial governments of Entre Ríos, Santa Fe, Chaco, Misiones and Río Negro.

He directed the Department of General and Applied Hydrology of the UNL, and was the first dean of his faculty. He served as Secretary of Scientific Investigation and Secretary General of UNL. On 22 February 2000 the University Assembly elected him rector, in order to complete the term of Hugo Storero (who had resigned to become a National Deputy). He presided the National Inter-University Council until October 2000, and was part of the Directorship of CONICET (the National Scientific and Technical Research Council), in representation of public and private universities.

He was reelected as rector of the UNL in November 2005, and served from March 2006 until December 2007, when he left to become mayor of Santa Fe.

Career in politics
Barletta ran for the office of Mayor of Santa Fe City on the election of 2 September 2007, representing the Progressive, Civic and Social Front (the same coalition which took the Socialist Hermes Binner to the governor's seat). He came first in the race (32.64% of the vote), with a slight difference of about 3,000 votes, ahead of the Justicialist/Front for Victory candidate Martín Balbarrey (the former mayor, running for reelection), and the independent Peronist candidate Oscar Martínez.

Among his first government measures, Barletta announced the start of a permanent internal audit of the municipality's finances, and declared a "hydrical emergency", to deal swiftly with the vulnerable state of the city facing large amounts of rainfall. Santa Fe City, located in low terrain besides two large rivers, suffered a large flood in 2003, and another serious flood during the autumn 2007 season.

Days after completing his term as Mayor of Santa Fe, Barletta was elected President of the National Committee of the Radical Civic Union (UCR) in December 2011 as a consensus candidate.

References

1953 births
Living people
People from Santa Fe, Argentina
Argentine people of Italian descent
National University of the Littoral alumni
Argentine engineers
Hydraulic engineers
Academic staff of the National University of the Littoral
Mayors of Santa Fe, Argentina
Radical Civic Union politicians
Members of the Argentine Chamber of Deputies elected in Santa Fe